Justice Felix Reginald Dias Bandaranaike II (17 January 1891 – 26 October 1951) was a Ceylonese (Sri Lankan) judge and lawyer. He was a Puisne Justice of the Supreme Court of Ceylon.

Born to Felix Reginald Dias Bandaranaike I, he was educated at the Royal College Colombo and graduated from the University of Cambridge.

Dias Bandaranaike married “Princess” Joy De Livera, they had one son, Reginald Walter Michael Dias Bandaranaike. He later married  Freda Dias Abeysinghe. Their children include Christine Manel Dias Bandaranaike and Felix Dias Bandaranaike.

References

External links
 The SCHARFF - Family #1006

1891 births
1951 deaths
Sinhalese lawyers
Alumni of Royal College, Colombo
Alumni of the University of Cambridge
Puisne Justices of the Supreme Court of Ceylon
Sinhalese judges
Felix Reginald
British Ceylon judges
Ceylonese advocates